Goussainville is the name of two communes of France:

Goussainville, Eure-et-Loir in the Eure-et-Loir département
Goussainville, Val-d'Oise in the Val-d'Oise département

See also
Gussainville, a commune  in the Meuse département